The 2008 McNeese State Cowboys football team was an American football team that represented McNeese State University as a member of the Southland Conference (Southland) during the 2008 NCAA Division I FCS football season. In their third year under head coach Matt Viator, the team compiled an overall record of 7–4, with a mark of 4–3 in conference play, and finished second in the Southland.

Schedule

Notes

References

McNeese State
McNeese Cowboys football seasons
McNeese State Cowyboys football